Boris Petrovich Chirkov (13 August 1901, Brianka – 28 May 1982, Moscow) was a Soviet and Russian actor and pedagogue. He appeared in 50 films between 1928 and 1975. He was awarded four Stalin Prizes: in 1941, 1947, 1949, and in 1952. People's Artist of the USSR (1950) and Hero of Socialist Labour (1975).

Selected filmography

 My Son (1928) - Patashon
 Luna sleva (1929) - Orskiy
 Rodnoy brat (1929) - Grishka
 Alone (1931) - Man Talking on the Phone
 Pesnya o shchastye (1934) - Chief disciplinary section
 Chapaev (1934) - Peasant
 The Youth of Maxim (1935) - Maksim
 Girl Friends (1936) - Senka
 Lenochka i vinograd (1936)
 The Return of Maxim (1937) - Maksim
 The Defense of Volotchayevsk (1937) - Old Man
 The Great Citizen (1938) - Maksim, the investigator
 Chelovek s ruzhyom (1938) - Yevtushenko
 The Vyborg Side (1938) - Maksim
 Minin and Pozharsky (1939) - Roman
 The New Teacher (1939) - Stepan Ivanovich Lautin
 Boyevoy kinosbornik 3 (1941) - (segment "Antosha Rybkin")
 This Is the Enemy (1942)
 Aleksandr Parkhomenko (1942) - Nestor Makhno
 Antosha Rybkin (1942) - Antosha Rybkin
 The Front (1943) - Udivitelnyy
 Partizany v stepyakh Ukrainy (1943) - Grandfather Taras
 Kutuzov (1944) - Lavilov
 Ivan Nikulin: Russian Sailor (1945) - Zakhar Fomichyov
 The Great Glinka (1946) - Mikhail Ivanovich Glinka
 The Court of Honor (1948) - Andrey Vereyskiy akademik
 Three Encounters (1949) - Nikanor Samoseev
 Dream of a Cossack (1951) - Kondratyev
 The Miners of Donetsk (1951) - Stepan Nedolya
 The Boarder (1953)
 True Friends (1954) - Chishov
 Dimitrovgradtsy (1956) - Sobolev
 For the Power of the Soviets (1956) - Secreatary Chernoivanenko
 Svoimi rukami (1956) - Rudenko
 Ryadom s nami (1958) - Stletov
 Dorogoy moy chelovek (1958)
 Kievlyanka (1958) - Yakov Petrovich Sereda
 Mechty sbyvayutsya (1959) - Pavel Andreyevich Leshchuk
 Poteryannaya fotografiya (1959)
 Nasledniki (1960)
 Svoya golova na plechakh (1961) - Kolkhoz Chairman
 Gorizont (1962) - Likhobaba
 A Trip Without a Load (1963) - Ded na aerodrome
 Greshnyy angel (1963) - Religioznyy starik
 Kain XVIII (1963) - Lavatory Worker
 The Alive and the Dead (1964) - Gavrila Biryukov
 Möcüzälär adasi (1964)
 Golubaya chashka (1964)
 Artakarg handznararutyun (1966) - Police spy
 Pervyy posetitel (1966)
 Myatezhnaya zastava (1967)
 Seven Old Men and a Girl (1970, TV Movie)
 Shutite? (1971) - (segment "Vanderbul' bezhit za gorizont")
 Izhorskiy batalon (1972) - Vanechka
 Po sobstvennomu zhelaniyu (1973)
 Rosa (1975)
 Gorozhane (1976) - Stariy master

References

External links
 
 
 

1901 births
1982 deaths
20th-century Russian male actors
People from Brianka
People from Yekaterinoslav Governorate
Communist Party of the Soviet Union members
Academic staff of the Gerasimov Institute of Cinematography
Russian State Institute of Performing Arts alumni
Third convocation members of the Soviet of the Union
Heroes of Socialist Labour
Honored Artists of the RSFSR
People's Artists of the USSR
Recipients of the Order of Lenin
Recipients of the Order of the Red Banner of Labour
Recipients of the Order of the Red Star
Stalin Prize winners

Russian male film actors
Russian male stage actors
Russian male voice actors
Soviet male film actors
Soviet male stage actors
Soviet male voice actors
Burials at Novodevichy Cemetery